Lincoln Regional Airport  is a public airport located  southwest of the central business district of Lincoln, a town in Penobscot County, Maine, United States. It is owned by the Town of Lincoln.

Although most U.S. airports use the same three-letter location identifier for the FAA and IATA, this airport is assigned LRG by the FAA but has no designation from the IATA (which assigned LRG to Lora Lai, Pakistan).

Facilities and aircraft
It also has one seaplane landing area (6W/24W) measuring 2,400 x 100 ft (732 x 30 m).

For the 12-month period ending July 31, 2006, the airport had 3,800 aircraft operations, an average of 10 per day, 100% of which were general aviation. There are 34 aircraft based at this airport: 91% single engine, 3% multi-engine and 6% ultralight.

References

External links 
 
 

Airports in Penobscot County, Maine
Lincoln, Maine